Microtubule-associated protein RP/EB family member 2 is a protein that in humans is encoded by the MAPRE2 gene.

Function 

The protein encoded by this gene shares significant homology to the adenomatous polyposis coli (APC) protein-binding EB1 gene family. The function of this protein is unknown; however, its homology suggests involvement in tumorigenesis of colorectal cancers and proliferative control of normal cells. This gene may belong to the intermediate/early gene family, involved in the signal transduction cascade downstream of the TCR.

Interactions 

MAPRE2 has been shown to interact with APC.

References

Further reading